Nikolay Tenev Khristozov (born 5 March 1915, date of death unknown) was a Bulgarian sports shooter. He competed in the 50 meter pistol event at the 1952 Summer Olympics.

References

External links
 

1915 births
Year of death missing
Bulgarian male sport shooters
Olympic shooters of Bulgaria
Shooters at the 1952 Summer Olympics
Place of birth missing